Keith Robert Nelson (18 February 1947 – 29 January 2020) was an association football player who represented New Zealand at international level.

Career
Born in Renfrew, Scotland, his first club in semi-professional football was with his hometown club Renfrew, but he quickly moved onto Cambuslang Rangers where he was a prolific goalscorer, winning the Scottish Junior Cup on four occasions in 1969, 1971, 1972 and 1973 as well as winning four caps with the Scottish Junior International team, scoring in all four games against Republic of Ireland, Northern Ireland, Wales and England.

He emigrated to New Zealand to join Hamilton AFC in 1974, and played a prominent role in the Waikato club's rise to the national league. He then continued to find the net with regularity at the highest level of domestic football.

Nelson became a naturalised New Zealand citizen in December 1976. He made his full All Whites debut in a 3–0 win over New Caledonia on 5 March 1977 and ended his international playing career with 20 A-international caps and 16 goals to his credit, including two hat-tricks against Chinese Taipei and Fiji. He gained his final cap gained in a 2–0 win over Ghana on 7 June 1983.

Nelson won New Zealand Player of the Year in 1976 and again in 1982, despite failing to make the final 23-man squad for New Zealand's first appearance at the World Cup finals that year (during which they faced his birth nation Scotland).

Nelson died on 29 January 2020.

References

External links

1947 births
2020 deaths
Scottish footballers
New Zealand association footballers
New Zealand international footballers
Association football forwards
People from Renfrew
Scottish emigrants to New Zealand
Naturalised citizens of New Zealand
Footballers from Renfrewshire
Renfrew F.C. players
Cambuslang Rangers F.C. players
Scottish Junior Football Association players
Scotland junior international footballers